Eterosonycha is a genus of spiders in the family Anapidae. It was first described in 1932 by Butler. , it contains 4 Australian species.

References

Anapidae
Araneomorphae genera
Spiders of Australia